Rokautskyia fernseeoides is a species of flowering plant in the family Bromeliaceae, endemic to Brazil (the state of Espírito Santo). It was first described by Elton Leme in 1996 as Cryptanthus fernseeoides.

References

fernseeoides
Flora of Brazil
Plants described in 1996